Chauth Mata Temple is located in a village named Chauth Ka Barwara in Sawai Madhopur district of Indian state of Rajasthan.

History 
This is one of the oldest temple of Rajasthan. This was built by Bhim Singh of Marwar, brought the Chauth Mata idol from a nearby village.

References

Temples in Rajasthan
Tourist attractions in Sawai Madhopur district
Shakti temples